Brian Langtry (born May 16, 1976) is a former lacrosse player for the Colorado Mammoth of the National Lacrosse League and the Denver Outlaws of Major League Lacrosse.  Langtry was born in Massapequa, NY, and played NCAA lacrosse for Hofstra University.

NLL
Langtry began his NLL career with the New York Saints in 2000, but only played three games. He didn't play again until 2003 with the Mammoth, and was named the NLL Rookie of the Year. He won the Champion's Cup with the Mammoth in 2006.

In 2003, Langtry scored the game-winning goal in the Mammoth's first-ever game, a 13-12 double-overtime victory over the Toronto Rock.

In the 2007 National Lacrosse League expansion draft, Langtry was selected by the expansion Boston Blazers, but was immediately traded back to the Mammoth. On March 22, 2008, Langtry set a career high with 9 goals and added 4 assists as the Mammoth lost to the Portland LumberJax, and was awarded "Offensive Player of the Week" honors by the league. During the 2009 NLL season, he was named a reserve to the All-Star game.

Langtry announced his retirement shortly before the 2012 season.

Statistics

NLL

MLL

Awards

Career After Lacrosse 
Brian Langtry taught Humanities at the Challenge School in Denver, Colorado. He resigned after a legal incident.

References

1976 births
Living people
American lacrosse players
Colorado Mammoth players
Hofstra Pride men's lacrosse players
Major League Lacrosse players
National Lacrosse League All-Stars
National Lacrosse League major award winners
People from Massapequa, New York
Lacrosse players from New York (state)
Sportspeople from Nassau County, New York
Denver Outlaws players
New York Saints players